Olena Kostiantynivna Kondratiuk (born 17 November 1970) is a Ukrainian politician and public relations specialist. She was first elected to the Verkhovna Rada in the 2007 Ukrainian parliamentary elections, and has been a People's Deputy of Ukraine since. From 2019, she has been the Second Deputy Chair of the Verkhovna Rada.

Early life and education
Olena Kondratiuk was born in Lviv. In 1993, she graduated from Lviv University as a historian. Later Kondratiuk also defended her dissertation becoming Candidate of historical sciences.

Career
Before being elected to the Verkhovna Rada for the first time in 2007, Kondratiuk was a director of a local PR agency "Radnyk" and a member of Reforms and Order Party. In 2007 she entered the Rada on a party list of the electoral bloc of Yulia Tymoshenko as a member of Reforms and Order Party.

References

External links


1970 births
Living people
Politicians from Lviv
University of Lviv alumni
Sixth convocation members of the Verkhovna Rada
Seventh convocation members of the Verkhovna Rada
Eighth convocation members of the Verkhovna Rada
Ninth convocation members of the Verkhovna Rada
Deputy chairmen of the Verkhovna Rada
Ukrainian public relations people
21st-century Ukrainian women politicians
Women members of the Verkhovna Rada